Helcogramma decurrens, known commonly as the black-throated triplefin, is a species of triplefin blenny in the genus Helcogramma. It was described by Allan Riverstone McCulloch and Edgar Ravenswood Waite in 1918.

References

Black-throated triplefin
Taxa named by Allan Riverstone McCulloch
Taxa named by Edgar Ravenswood Waite
Fish described in 1918